Albert Hobson (7 April 1925 – 23 December 2017) was an English footballer who played for Blackpool, Huddersfield Town and York City.

Career
Hobson started his career with Blackpool in August 1945. He joined Huddersfield Town in July 1954 and finally moved to York City in March 1956. He died on 23 December 2017 at the age of 92.

References
Specific

General
Gerry Wolstenholme's obituary for Albert Hobson - 30 December 2017

1925 births
2017 deaths
People from Glossop
Footballers from Derbyshire
English footballers
English Football League players
Association football midfielders
Blackpool F.C. players
Huddersfield Town A.F.C. players
York City F.C. players